Boyan Peykov (Bulgarian Cyrillic: Боян Пейков; born 1 May 1984) is a former Bulgarian footballer who played as a goalkeeper. Peykov is currently goalkeeping coach at Cherno More Varna.

Club career
Peykov had previously played for Conegliano German, Nesebar, Vidima-Rakovski, Dunav Rousse, Minyor Radnevo and Beroe Stara Zagora. With Beroe he won Bulgarian Cup for 2009-10 season. Peykov signed with Litex Lovech in August 2013 as a cover for Evgeni Aleksandrov after their first choice goalkeeper Ilko Pirgov had sustained an injury.

On 4 November 2016, following a 2–3 home defeat by Pomorie, Peykov was released by Tsarsko Selo Sofia as a player. Peykov continued to be the goalkeepers coach in the team.

International career
Peykov earned his only cap for Bulgaria on 9 February 2011 in the 2–2 away draw with Estonia in a friendly match after coming on as a second-half substitute for Nikolay Mihaylov.

Honours

Club
Beroe
Bulgarian Cup: 2009-10

References

External links
 
 

1984 births
Living people
Bulgarian footballers
Bulgaria international footballers
First Professional Football League (Bulgaria) players
PFC Nesebar players
PFC Vidima-Rakovski Sevlievo players
FC Dunav Ruse players
PFC Beroe Stara Zagora players
FC Lokomotiv 1929 Sofia players
Zawisza Bydgoszcz players
PFC Minyor Pernik players
PFC Litex Lovech players
FC Haskovo players
FC Tsarsko Selo Sofia players
Bulgarian expatriate footballers
Expatriate footballers in Poland
Bulgarian expatriate sportspeople in Poland
Association football goalkeepers
Sportspeople from Haskovo Province